Shaka King (born March 7, 1980) is an American film director, screenwriter, and film producer. He is best known for directing and co-writing the 2021 biopic Judas and the Black Messiah.

Biography 
An only child, King was born on March 7, 1980 in Crown Heights and grew up in Bedford-Stuyvesant, both in Brooklyn, New York. His mother's family was from Barbados and Panama, while his father's family was from Panama. Both parents worked as public school teachers. King's early education occurred in the neighborhoods of East Harlem and Fort Greene. He attended a predominantly white preparatory school in Bay Ridge during his middle and high school years. It was in high school that he discovered his passion for creative writing.

King studied political science and took his first film production course at Vassar College. After graduating, he practiced screenwriting while working as a youth counselor and tutor. In 2007, he entered a graduate film program at New York University Tisch School of the Arts where he was a student of Spike Lee. King's thesis for his masters of fine arts resulted in the feature film Newlyweeds.

King currently lives in the borough of Brooklyn.

Career 
King's debut feature film Newlyweeds is about a free-spirited young couple who live in Bedford-Stuyvesant and who prefer to indulge in marijuana and hashish. The film premiered at the 2013 Sundance Film Festival. He presented his next film, Mulignans, in the USA Narrative Short Films program at the 2015 Sundance Film Festival. His 2017 short film LaZercism, starring Lakeith Stanfield, tells of a world in which white people suffer from “racial glaucoma.”  Stanfield also appears in King's second feature film, Judas and the Black Messiah, in which Daniel Kaluuya plays the role of Fred Hampton. The feature was nominated for six Academy Awards, including specific nods for King for Best Original Screenplay, and Best Picture. More recently, he got a first-look deal with FX Productions to develop television.

Filmography

Films

Short films

Television

Awards and nominations

References

External links 
 

 

1980 births
African-American film directors
African-American film producers
African-American screenwriters
African-American television directors
American male screenwriters
American people of Barbadian descent
American people of Panamanian descent
American television directors
Artists from Brooklyn
Film directors from New York (state)
Film directors from New York City
Film producers from New York (state)
Living people
People from Bedford–Stuyvesant, Brooklyn
Screenwriters from New York (state)
Tisch School of the Arts alumni
Vassar College alumni
Writers from Brooklyn